Laney is an unincorporated community located in the town of Maple Grove, Shawano County, Wisconsin, United States. The Laney School is listed on the National Register of Historic Places.

References

Unincorporated communities in Shawano County, Wisconsin
Unincorporated communities in Wisconsin